Haotian Pagoda or Liangxiang Pagoda is an octagonal brick pagoda situated in Haotian park in the Fangshan District of Beijing. It has 5 octahedral shaped hollow tiers and is 36m high. Originally constructed during Sui dynasty, the pagoda has been rebuilt a few times in the last few centuries. The brick tower standing today was built during the Liao dynasty (907–1125). In 1984 and 1997, the Beijing Municipal Administration of Cultural Heritage donated a total of over 16 million Chinese yuan for restoration works.  Haotian park is closed for renovations of the pagoda.

Features

Haotian is the only hollow Buddhist pagoda standing in Beijing. Each of the 5 tiers has 4 doors (辟券门), facing the north, south, east and west. Originally, there were 4 buddha sculptures on each floor, but most of them have been damaged by the Eight-Nation Alliance in 1901. A spiral staircase inside the tower can be used to climb to the top, which gave a view of the capital in the 12th century. Each floor also has little orifices (瞭望孔) and might have been used for military purposes in the war between Liao and Song dynasty.

The Haotian Pagoda is now a part of Haotian Park (昊天公园) that opened in 1998. In addition to the pagoda, Haotian Park features a lake (昊天湖) and several pavilions.  The entrance fee is 5 yuan.

Transportation
Haotian Pagoda is situated in Liangxiang of Fangshan District. Public bus can be used to access the pagoda. The bus stop Liangxiangdongguan (良乡东关) of line 646, 832, 834, 835, 951, 971, 993, Fang 1 (Nei), Fang 1 (Wai), Fang 27 and Fang 39 is within walking distance of the entrance of Haotian Park.

See also
Fangshan District
History of Beijing
List of landmarks in Beijing
List of pagodas in Beijing

External links

Buddhist temples in Beijing
Pagodas in China
Buildings and structures in Fangshan District
Liao dynasty architecture
Khitan history
Octagonal buildings in China
12th-century Buddhist temples
12th-century establishments in China
Towers completed in the 12th century